A reverb effect, or reverb, is an audio effect applied to a sound signal to simulate reverberation. It may be created through physical means, such as echo chambers, or electronically through audio signal processing.

Varieties

Echo chambers 
The first reverb effects, introduced in the 1930s, were created by playing recordings through loudspeakers in reverberating spaces and recording the sound. American Producer Bill Putnam is credited for the first artistic use of artificial reverb in music, on the 1947 song "Peg o' My Heart" by the Harmonicats. Putnam placed a microphone and loudspeaker in the studio bathroom to create a natural echo chamber, adding an "eerie dimension".

Plate reverb 

A plate reverb system uses an electromechanical transducer, similar to the driver in a loudspeaker, to create vibrations in a large plate of sheet metal. The plate's motion is picked up by one or more contact microphones whose output is an audio signal which may be added to the original "dry" signal. Plate reverb was introduced in the late 1950s by Elektromesstechnik with the EMT 140.

Spring reverb 

Spring reverbs, introduced by Bell Labs, use a set of springs mounted inside a box. They work similarly to plate reverb, with a transducer and pickup placed at either end of the spring. They were popular in the 1960s, and were first used by the Hammond company to add reverb to Hammond organs. They became popular with guitarists, including surf musicians such as Dick Dale, as they could easily be built into guitar amplifiers. They were also used by dub reggae musicians such as King Tubby. Laurens Hammond was granted a patent on a spring-based mechanical reverberation system in 1939.

Digital reverb 

Digital reverb units simulate reverb by using multiple delay lines with fading trails, giving the impression of sound bouncing off surfaces. Some digital effects allow users to independently adjust early and late reflections. Digital reverb was introduced in 1976 by EMT with the EMT 250, and became popular in the 1980s.

Gated reverb 

Gated reverb combines reverb with a noise gate, creating a "large" sound with a short tail. It was pioneered by English recording engineer Hugh Padgham and drummer Phil Collins, and became a staple of 1980s pop music.

Convolution reverb 
Convolution uses impulse responses to record the reverberation of physical spaces and recreate them digitally. The first real-time convolution reverb processor, the DRE S777, was announced by Sony in 1999. Convolution reverb is often used in film production, with sound engineers recording impulse responses of sets and locations so sounds can be added in post-production with realistic reverberation.

Shimmer reverb 
Shimmer reverb alters the pitch of the reverberated sound, an effect often used in ambient music.

References 

Audio effects